Alvares is a ski resort in the Iranian province of Ardabil. It is the second standard ski resort in Iran and is situated in the hamlet of Alvares, which is located 24 kilometers away from the city of Sarein at an elevation of 3,200 meters above sea level.

See also
List of ski areas and resorts in Iran

External links
irna.ir

Ski areas and resorts in Iran
Tourist attractions in Ardabil Province
Buildings and structures in Ardabil Province
Sport in Ardabil Province